Ludlow College is a sixth form college situated in the heart of Ludlow, Shropshire, England. It now forms part of the Herefordshire and Ludlow College, though retains its own identity.

History
Its history traces back to the reign of King John in 13th century. After centuries of being an exclusively boys school, in 1967 the then Ludlow Grammar School merged with Ludlow Girls High School, the whole retaining the name Ludlow Grammar School. A peculiarity of the boys Grammar School was that there was no 1st year, with new boys entering in the 2nd year. Ludlow Grammar School was founded c. 1200, making it one of the oldest educational institutions in England. In 1977 the (merged) grammar school became Ludlow College, with secondary education in the town instead being provided only by the Ludlow Church of England School.

Campus
The original boys school is in ancient stone and brick buildings at the bottom of Mill Street, including the Palmers Hall, a Grade II* listed building. The girls school was founded in an expansive Georgian red-brick mansion at the top of Mill Street/on Castle Square. Today three sites are used by the college – Castle Square (the former girls school), Mill Street (the former boys school) and Lower Mill Street.

Notable alumni
Nicholas Grey – founder of Grey Technology (Gtech) design and manufacturing company
Richard Stanley Hawks Moody
Wynn Normington Hugh-Jones
Adrian Jones (sculptor)
Keith Jones – former Dean of York
John Marston (businessman) – founder of Sunbeam Cycles
Thomas Wright (antiquarian)

See also
Grade II* listed buildings in Shropshire Council (H–Z)
Listed buildings in Ludlow (northern area)

References

External links
Ludlow College
Herefordshire & Ludlow College

Ludlow
Sixth form colleges in Shropshire
Grade II* listed buildings in Shropshire